The National Institute for Research in Digital Science and Technology  (Inria) is a French national research institution focusing on computer science and applied mathematics.
It was created under the name Institut de recherche en informatique et en automatique (IRIA) in 1967 at Rocquencourt near Paris, part of Plan Calcul. Its first site was the historical premises of SHAPE (central command of NATO military forces), which is still used as Inria's main headquarters. In 1980, IRIA became INRIA. Since 2011, it has been styled Inria.

Inria is a Public Scientific and Technical Research Establishment (EPST) under the double supervision of the French Ministry of National Education, Advanced Instruction and Research and the Ministry of Economy, Finance and Industry.

Administrative status

Inria has 9 research centers distributed across France (in Bordeaux, Grenoble-Inovallée, Lille, Lyon, Nancy, Paris-Rocquencourt, Rennes, Saclay, and Sophia Antipolis) and one center abroad in Santiago de Chile, Chile. It also contributes to academic research teams outside of those centers.

Inria Rennes is part of the joint Institut de recherche en informatique et systèmes aléatoires (IRISA) with several other entities.

Before December 2007, the three centers of Bordeaux, Lille and Saclay formed a single research center called INRIA Futurs.

In October 2010, Inria, with Pierre and Marie Curie University (Now Sorbonne University) and Paris Diderot University started IRILL, a center for innovation and research initiative for free software.

Inria employs 3800 people. Among them are 1300 researchers, 1000 Ph.D. students and 500 postdoctorates.

Research

 
Inria does both theoretical and applied research in computer science. In the process, it has produced many widely used programs, such as

 Bigloo, a Scheme implementation
 CADP, a tool box for the verification of asynchronous concurrent systems
 Caml, a language from the ML family
 Caml Light and OCaml implementations
 Chorus, microkernel-based distributed operating system
 CompCert, verified C compiler for PowerPC, ARM and x86_32
 Contrail
 Coq, a proof assistant
 Eigen (C++ library)
 Esterel, a programming language for State Automata
 Geneauto — code-generation from model
 Graphite, a research platform for computer graphics, 3D modeling and numerical geometry
 Gudhi — A C++ library with Python interface for computational topology and topological data analysis
 Le Lisp, a portable Lisp implementation
 medInria, a medical image processing software, popularly used for MRI images.
 GNU MPFR, an arbitrary-precision floating-point library
 OpenViBE, a software platform dedicated to designing, testing and using brain–computer interfaces.
 Pharo, an open-source Smalltalk derived from Squeak .
 scikit-learn, a machine learning software package
 Scilab, a numerical computation software package
 SimGrid
 SmartEiffel, a free Eiffel compiler
 SOFA, an open source framework for multi-physics simulation with an emphasis on medical simulation.
 TOM, a pattern matching language
 ViSP, an open source visual servoing platform library 
 XtreemFS
 XtreemOS
 Zenon, an extensible automated theorem prover producing checkable proofs

Inria furthermore leads French AI Research, ranking 12th worldwide in 2019, based on accepted publications at the prestigious Conference on Neural Information Processing Systems.

References

Further reading

External links

 

Computer science research organizations
History of computing in France
Scientific agencies of the government of France
Theoretical computer science
Computer science institutes in France
Members of the European Research Consortium for Informatics and Mathematics
Information technology research institutes